Mark Katakowski is an American entrepreneur and scientist specializing in stem-cell therapy. He is the president and chief science officer at Forever Labs.

Background 
Katakowski was born and raised in the state of Michigan, the youngest child of two educators. He received a B.S. in Physics and a Ph.D. in Medical Physics from Oakland University. He later served as a research staff scientist at Henry Ford Health System in 
Detroit, MI, where he did research on stem cells. He has over 45 peer reviewed scientific journal articles under his name.

Entrepreneurship 
In an effort to hone his coding skills, in 2010, Katakowski created the social aggregator Hubski, utilizing arc, the underlying framework from Hacker News.

In 2015, Katakowski co-founded Forever Labs, a longevity company specializing in the harvesting and storage of adult stem cells. Forever Labs was part of the summer 2017 Y Combinator batch. He currently serves as president and chief scientific officer.

Katakowski's 2017 work hypothesizes that rejuvenating the bone marrow by autologous heterochronic transplantation of cells could extend healthy lifespan.

Other work 
Mark is also a painter and writer. His blog Under Odysseus was featured in Sarah Boxer's 2008 book, Ultimate Blogs.

References

Notes

External links
Twitter account

American scientists
Living people
American gerontologists
Date of birth missing (living people)
Year of birth missing (living people)